Joe Zelli (Rome 1889 – Copake, New York 1971) ran celebrated nightclubs in Paris and New York City from the 1910s to the 1930s.

Zelli's Club, 16bis rue Fontaine, Paris opened in 1922 and closed in 1932. It had a balcony with an American bar and "royal boxes". Zelli owned other clubs as well.

A caricaturist named Zito drew guests to the nightclub over a period of four years, making a celebrity wall downstairs. This is said to be the inspiration for the caricatures at Sardi's in New York.

Notes 

1889 births
1971 deaths
Italian emigrants to the United States